Buck & Hickman is a distributor of tools, maintenance and health & safety products. Established in 1840, the company has also produced tools under the Roebuck brand.

Since 2018, Buck & Hickman is part of Rubix.

References

External links
 www.buckandhickman.com

Tool manufacturing companies of the United Kingdom
Companies based in Manchester